Russelldale is an unincorporated community in Mineral County, West Virginia, United States. Russelldale is located on Patterson Creek Mountain to the east of Patterson Creek.

Unincorporated communities in Mineral County, West Virginia
Unincorporated communities in West Virginia